Thomas Chase (1827-1892) was a United States educator and classical scholar. He was on the faculty of Haverford College and later its president.

Biography
Chase was born in Worcester, Massachusetts. At nine years of age, he was introduced to Latin; Greek at ten. He graduated in 1848 at Harvard University. Beginning in 1850, he served as a substitute Latin professor at Harvard for a year, and another year and a half as an instructor, and then a tutor.

He studied in Europe from 1853 to 1855, at the University of Berlin and the Collège de France mainly, and as a listener at other universities. He was professor of Greek and Latin at Haverford College from 1855 to 1875. He was elected as a member of the American Philosophical Society in 1864. From 1875 to 1886 he was president of Haverford. In 1887 Chase was elected a member of the American Antiquarian Society. He was a member of the American committee for the revision of the New Testament, and a delegate to the Stockholm Philological Congress of 1889.

Publications
 Hellas: Her Monuments and Scenery (1863; at Internet Archive)
 An address on the character and example of President Lincoln (1865; at Internet Archive)
 A Latin Grammar (1882; at Internet Archive)
His “Use of Italics in the English Bible” was part of an 1879 pamphlet issued by the Bible revision committee.

Editions
 Cicero's Tusculan disputations: book first, the dream of Scipio and extracts from the dialogues on old age and friendship (1866)
 Horace (1884; at Internet Archive)
 The histories of Livy (1882; at Internet Archive)
 Virgil, The Æneid (1884; at Internet Archive)
 Selections from the Satires of Juvenal (1885; at Internet Archive)

Family
He was a brother of Pliny Chase.

Notes

References

External links
 

1827 births
1892 deaths
Haverford College faculty
Presidents of Haverford College
American classical scholars
Harvard University alumni
Scholars of Latin literature
Members of the American Antiquarian Society
Earle family